Syed  Kazim Shah was the former Sindh parliament member elected for Nawabshah in 1987. He was the member of the Pakistan Muslim League-N (PML-N). He was also appointed  advisor to the chief minister of Sindh in 1994. He was a notable personality of his political party and Sindh province. He was also a former chairman of Pakistan Khidmat Khalf, and  received  numerous awards for his good deeds by running a free food chain where the poor people ate what they wanted with free of cost. 

1998 deaths
Pakistan Muslim League (N) politicians
People from Shaheed Benazir Abad District
Year of birth missing